Dr. André Joseph Guillaume Henri 'Dok' Kostermans (Purworejo, 1 July 1906 – Jakarta, 10 July 1994) was an Indonesian botanist of Dutch ancestry. He was born in Purworejo, Java, Dutch East Indies, and educated at Utrecht University, taking his doctoral degree in 1936 with a paper on Surinamese Lauraceae.

He spent most of his professional life studying the plants of southeastern Asia, settled at Buitenzorg, later Bogor, Indonesia. At an early stage in his career he also contributed a number of family treatments to Pulle's Flora of Suriname. Kostermans was especially interested in Lauraceae, Malvales (Bombacaceae and Sterculiaceae), and Dipterocarpaceae. In later years he turned his attention to Asian Anacardiaceae. He was a productive worker and published extensively on these and other groups.
The genus Kostermansia Soegeng, of the family Bombacaceae, and over 50 species were named in his honour.

Kostermans suffered a heart attack in March 1991, but his letter to his friend written in April 1991 stated "some writing (including) putting the finishing touch to a fat manuscript on the Mango species (69 species) ... If I am lucky I shall have a chance to see it." Kostermans did live to see it published by Academic Press in 1993. He died in Indonesia in 1994.

References

 ASPT NEWSLETTER 9(1) January 1995 URL accessed 26 March 2006.

External links
Nationaal Herbarium Nederland: André Joseph Guillaume Henri Kostermans
Image of grave

1906 births
1994 deaths
Deaths in Indonesia
20th-century botanists
20th-century Dutch botanists
Indonesian people of Dutch descent
Dutch people of Indonesian descent
Dutch expatriates in Indonesia
People from Purworejo Regency
People of the Dutch East Indies
Utrecht University alumni